Endemism is the state of a species being found in a single defined geographic location, such as an island, state, nation, country or other defined zone; organisms that are indigenous to a place are not endemic to it if they are also found elsewhere. For example, the Cape sugarbird is found exclusively in southwestern South Africa and is therefore said to be endemic to that particular part of the world.

An endemic species can also be referred to as an endemism or in scientific literature as an endemite. For example Cytisus aeolicus is an endemite of the Italian flora. Adzharia renschi was once believed to be an endemite of the Caucasus, but it was later discovered to be a non-indigenous species from South America belonging to a different genus.

The extreme opposite of an endemic species is one with a cosmopolitan distribution, having a global or widespread range.

A rare alternative term for a species that is endemic is "precinctive", which applies to species (and other taxonomic levels) that are restricted to a defined geographical area. Other terms that sometimes are used interchangeably, but less often, include autochthonal, autochthonic, and indigenous, however, these terms do not reflect the status of a species that specifically belongs only to a determined place.

Etymology

History of the concept 
The word endemic is from New Latin endēmicus, from Greek ἔνδημος, éndēmos, "native". Endēmos is formed of en meaning "in", and dēmos meaning "the people". The word entered the English language as a loan word from French endémique, and originally seems to have been used in the sense of diseases that occur at a constant amount in a country, as opposed to epidemic diseases, which are exploding in cases. The word was used in biology in 1872 to mean a species restricted to a specific location by Charles Darwin.

The more uncommon term 'precinctive' has been used by some entomologists as the equivalent of 'endemic'. Precinctive was coined in 1900 by David Sharp when describing the Hawaiian insects, as he was uncomfortable with the fact that the word 'endemic' is often associated with diseases. 'Precinctive' was first used in botany by Vaughan MacCaughey in Hawaii in 1917.

Overview 

Endemism in general excludes examples kept by humans in botanical gardens or zoological parks, as well as populations introduced outside of their native ranges. Juan J. Morrone states that a species may be endemic to any particular geographic region, regardless of size, thus the cougar is endemic to the Americas, however, endemism is normally used only where there is a considerable restriction in the area of distribution. All species are not endemics, some species may be cosmopolitan. All endemics are not necessarily rare; some might be common where they occur. All rare species are not necessarily endemics, some may have a large range but be rare throughout this range.

Endemism is caused by historical and ecological factors. Vicariant events caused by drifting continents, dispersal and extinction are some possible historical factors. Ecological factors can explain the present limits on a distribution. Endemic species are especially likely to develop in geographically and biologically isolated areas such as islands and remote island groups, including Hawaii, the Galápagos Islands and Socotra, because of the potential for isolation and therefore evolution through allopatric speciation. Darwin's finches in the Galápagos archipelago are examples of species endemic to islands. Similarly, isolated mountainous regions like the Ethiopian Highlands, or large bodies of water far from other lakes, like Lake Baikal, can also have high rates of endemism.

The stability of a region's climate and habitat through time may also contribute to high rates of endemism (especially paleoendemism), acting as refuges for species during times of climate change like Ice Ages. These changes may have caused species to repeatedly restrict their ranges into these refuges, leading to regions with many small-ranged species. In many cases biological factors, such as low rates of dispersal or returning to the spawning area (philopatry), can cause a particular group of organisms to have high speciation rates and thus many endemic species. for example, cichlids in the East African Rift Lakes have diversified into many more endemic species than the other fish families in the same lakes, possibly due to such factors. Plants that become endemic on isolated islands are often those which have a high rate of dispersal and are able to reach such islands by being dispersed by birds. While birds are less likely to be endemic to a region based on their ability to disperse via flight, there are over 2,500 species which are considered endemic, meaning that the species is restricted to an area less than 5 million hectares.

Microorganisms were traditionally not believed to form endemics. The hypothesis 'everything is everywhere', first stated in Dutch by Lourens G.M. Baas Becking in 1934, describes the theory that the distribution of organisms smaller than 2mm is cosmopolitan where habitats occur that support their growth.

Subtypes
The first subcategories were first introduced by Claude P. E. Favager and Juliette Contandriopoulis in 1961: schizoendemics, apoendemics and patroendemics. Using this work, Ledyard Stebbins and Jack Major then introduced the concepts of neoendemics and paleoendemics in 1965 to describe the endemics of California. Endemic taxa can also be classified into autochthonous, allochtonous, taxonomic relicts and biogeographic relicts.

Paleoendemism refers to species that were formerly widespread but are now restricted to a smaller area. Neoendemism refers to species that have recently arisen, such as through divergence and reproductive isolation or through hybridization and polyploidy in plants, and have not dispersed beyond a limited range.

Paleoendemism is more or less synonymous with the concept of a 'relict species': a population or taxon of organisms that were more widespread or more diverse in the past. A 'relictual population' is a population that currently occurs in a restricted area, but whose original range was far wider during a previous geologic epoch. Similarly, a 'relictual taxon' is a taxon (e.g. species or other lineage) that is the sole surviving representative of a formerly diverse group.

Schizoendemics, apoendemics and patroendemics can all be classified as types of neoendemics. Schizoendemics arise from a wider distributed taxon that has become reproductively isolated without becoming (potentially) genetically isolated – a schizoendemic has the same chromosome count as the parent taxon it evolved from. An apoendemic is a polyploid of the parent taxon (or taxa in the case of allopolyploids), whereas a patroendemic has a lower, diploid chromosome count than the related, more widely distributed polyploid taxon. Mikio Ono coined the term 'aneuendemics' in 1991 for species that have more or fewer chromosomes than their relatives due to aneuploidy.

Pseudoendemics are taxa that have possibly recently evolved from a mutation. Holoendemics is a concept introduced by Richardson in 1978 to describe taxa that have remained endemic to a restricted distribution for a very long time.

In a 2000 paper, Myers and de Grave further attempted to redefine the concept. In their view, everything is endemic, even cosmopolitan species are endemic to Earth, and earlier definitions restricting endemics to specific locations are wrong. Thus the subdivisions neoendemics and paleoendemics are without merit regarding the study of distributions, because these concepts consider that an endemic has a distribution limited to one place. Instead, they propose four different categories: holoendemics, euryendemics, stenoendemics and rhoendemics. In their scheme cryptoendemics and euendemics are further subdivisions of rhoendemics. In their view, a holoendemic is a cosmopolitan species. Stenoendemics, also known as local endemics, have a reduced distribution and are synonymous with the word 'endemics' in the traditional sense, whereas euryendemics have a larger distribution -both these have distributions that are more or less continuous. A rhoendemic has a disjunct distribution. Where this disjunct distribution is caused by vicariance, in a euendemic the vicariance was geologic in nature, such as the movement of tectonic plates, but in a cryptoendemic the disjunct distribution was due to the extinction of the intervening populations. There is yet another possible situation that can cause a disjunct distribution, where a species is able to colonize new territories by crossing over areas of unsuitable habitat, such as plants colonizing an island – this situation they dismiss as extremely rare and do not devise a name for. Traditionally, none of Myers and de Grave's categories would be considered endemics except stenoendemics.

Soil 

Serpentine soils act as 'edaphic islands' of low fertility and these soils lead to high rates of endemism. These soils are found in the Balkan Peninsula, Turkey, Alps, Cuba, New Caledonia, the North American Appalachians, and scattered distribution in California, Oregon, and Washington and elsewhere. For example, Mayer and Soltis considered the widespread subspecies Streptanthus glandulosus subsp. glandulosus which grows on normal soils, to be a paleoendemic, whereas closely related endemic forms of S. glandulosus occurring on serpentine soil patches are neoendemics which recently evolved from subsp. glandulosus.

Islands 
Isolated islands commonly develop a number of endemics. Many species and other higher taxonomic groups exist in very small terrestrial or aquatic islands, which restrict their distribution. The Devil's Hole pupfish, Cyprinodon diabolis, has its whole native population restricted to a spring that is 20 x 3 meters, in Nevada's Mojave Desert. This 'aquatic island' is connected to an underground basin; however, the population present in the pool remains isolated.

Other areas very similar to the Galapagos Islands of the Pacific Ocean exist and foster high rates of endemism. The Socotra Archipelago of Yemen, located in the Indian Ocean, has seen a new endemic species of parasitic leech, Myxobdella socotrensis, appear. This species is restricted to freshwater springs, where it may attach to and feed upon native crabs.

Mountains 

Mountains can be seen as 'sky islands': refugia of endemics because species that live in the cool climates of mountain peaks are geographically isolated. For example, in the Alpes-Maritimes department of France, Saxifraga florulenta is an endemic plant that may have evolved in the Late Miocene and could have once been widespread across the Mediterranean Basin.

Volcanoes also tend to harbor a number of endemic species. Plants on volcanoes tend to fill a specialized ecological niche, with a very restrictive range, due to the unique environmental characteristics. The Kula Volcano, one of the fourteen volcanoes in Turkey, is home to 13 endemic species of plants.

Conservation

Endemics might more easily become endangered or extinct because they are already restricted in distribution. This puts endemic plants and animals at greater risk than widespread species during the rapid climate change of this century. Some scientists claim that the presence of endemic species in an area is a good method to find geographical regions that can be considered priorities for conservation. Endemism can thus be studied as a proxy for measuring biodiversity of a region.

The concept of finding endemic species that occur in the same region to designate 'endemism hotspots' was first proposed by Paul Müller in a 1973 book. According to him, this is only possible where 1.) the taxonomy of the species in question is not in dispute; 2.) the species distribution is accurately known; and 3.) the species have relatively small distributional ranges.

In a 2000 article, Myers et al. used the standard of having more than 0.5% of the world's plant species being endemic to the region to designate 25 geographical areas of the world as 'biodiversity hotspots'.

In response to the above, the World Wildlife Fund has split the world into a few hundred geographical 'ecoregions'. These have been designed to include as many species as possible that only occur in a single ecoregion, and these species are thus 'endemics' to these ecoregions. Since plenty of these ecoregions have a high prevalence of endemics existing within them, many National Parks have been formed around or within them to further promote conservation. The Caparaó National Park was formed in the Atlantic Forest, a biodiversity hotspot located in Brazil, in order to help protect valuable and vulnerable species.

Other scientists have argued that endemism is not an appropriate measure of biodiversity, because the levels of threat or biodiversity are not actually correlated to areas of high endemism. When using bird species as an example, it was found that only 2.5% of biodiversity hotspots correlate with endemism and the threatened nature of a geographic region. A similar pattern had been found previously regarding mammals, Lasioglossum bees, Plusiinae moths, and swallowtail butterflies in North America: these different groups of taxa did not correlate geographically with each other regarding endemism and species richness. Especially using mammals as flagship species proved to be a poor system of identifying and protecting areas of high invertebrate biodiversity. In response to this, other scientists again defended the concept by using WWF ecoregions and reptiles, finding that most reptile endemics occur in WWF ecoregions with high biodiversity.

Other conservation efforts for endemics include keeping captive and semi-captive populations in zoological parks and botanical gardens. These methods are ex situ ("off-site") conservation methods. The use of such methods may not only offer refuge and protection for individuals of declining or vulnerable populations, but it may also allow biologists valuable opportunities to research them as well.

References

External links 
 

 
Biodiversity
Habitat
Biology terminology